Rhododendron ferrugineum, the alpenrose, snow-rose, or rusty-leaved alpenrose is an evergreen shrub that grows just above the tree line in the Alps, Pyrenees, Jura and northern Apennines, on acid soils. It is the type species for the genus Rhododendron.

Description
The undersides of the leaves are covered in rust-brown spots, which give the species the second part of its binomial name (ferrugineum, Latin for 'rust-coloured, ferruginous'). This is in contrast to Rhododendron hirsutum, which has no such brown colouring, has hairy edges to the leaves and grows over limestone. Where the two species co-occur (usually on soils of intermediate pH), the hybrid Rhododendron × intermedium may occur; as its name suggests, it is intermediate in form between the two parental species.

Habitat
Rhododendron ferrugineum grows primarily on acidic siliceous soils, whereas its close relative Rhododendron hirsutum grows on basic carbonate-rich soils. These two types of soils frequently occur near each other in the Alps.

Toxicity
Rhododendron ferrugineum is moderately toxic, containing arbutin, arecoline and rhodoxanthin, and can cause vomiting, and difficulties of the digestive, nervous, respiratory and circulatory systems.

References

External links

ferrugineum
Alpine flora
Flora of the Alps
Flora of Andorra
Plants described in 1753
Taxa named by Carl Linnaeus
 Flora of the Pyrenees